Chloe Noelle Magee (born 29 November 1988) is an Irish professional badminton player. She represented her country at the Olympic Games for three consecutive times in 2008 Beijing, 2012 London, and 2016 Rio de Janeiro. At the 2008 Summer Olympics in Beijing, she became the first Irish woman to win a badminton match at the Olympics. She has been described as "the poster girl for Irish badminton". Together with her brother Sam Magee, she clinched a bronze medal at the 2017 European Championships, became Ireland's first medal at the European Badminton Championship. The duo also captured the bronze medals at the 2015 and 2019 European Games.

Career

2007 
In 2007, Magee won the women's doubles title at the Irish International Championships in Lisburn. Competing alongside Bing Huang, the pair beat second seeds Eva Lee and Mesinee Mangkalakiri of the United States 21–15, 9–21, 21–11 in the final.

2008 Summer Olympics 
Magee competed for Ireland at the 2008 Summer Olympics in Beijing, China at the age of 19. She became the first ever Irish woman to win a badminton match at the Olympics, beating Estonian Kati Tolmoff by a score of 18–21, 21–18, 21–19 in the first round of the women's singles.  She was eliminated after losing her second round match 12–21, 14–21 to world number eleven Jun Jae-youn of South Korea. "I have loads to improve on and I will take away a lot from this," Magee said after the match.

2009 
In 2009, Magee competed at the World Championships in Hyderabad, India, losing in the first round to Japanese number two Ai Goto by a score of 21–13, 21–9.

2012 Summer Olympics 
Magee, ranked 44th in the world, qualified for the women's singles at the 2012 Summer Olympics in London as the 26 ranked player on the list of participants. She was one of two Irish badminton players at the Games; Scott Evans competed in the men's singles. Magee and her brother Sam, ranked 40th in the world as a pairing, were third reserves for the mixed doubles event.

In July 2012, Magee reached the final of the White Nights pre-Olympic tournament held in Russia. She beat Slovakian Monika Fasungova, 21–17, 20–22, 21–5, in the quarter-finals and Russia's Romina Gabdullina, 21–15, 17–21, 21–15, in the semi-finals but finished runner-up after losing to Poland's Kamila Augustyn, 21–19, 14–21, 14–21, despite having a 10–6 lead in the final set.

A slight schedule change led to Magee starting her 2012 Olympic campaign against Egypt's Hadia Hosny at 20.17 (29 July) and France's Hongyan Pi at 20.32 (30 July).

Bill O'Herlihy sparked controversy while covering Chloe Magee's progress at the 2012 Summer Olympics by suggesting badminton was "a mainly Protestant sport". RTÉ confirmed it received complaints about O'Herlihy's sectarian remarks on live television. The remarks prompted Magee to inform Highland Radio: "We need to remember what the Olympics is all about. I don't think it is any different from any other sport. There are people here from all over the world and from many different religions."

She lost 16–21, 21–18, 21–14, to Hongyan Pi and exited the 2012 Summer Olympics.

In December 2012, Magee reached the final of the Turkish Open.

2016 Summer Olympics 
In Rio，she lost the game to Chinese player Wang Yihan in Group P 7-21 and 12–21 and to Karin Schnaase by 14–21 and 19–21, placing third in her group.

Achievements

European Games 
Mixed doubles

European Championships 
Mixed doubles

BWF Grand Prix 
The BWF Grand Prix had two levels, the Grand Prix and Grand Prix Gold. It was a series of badminton tournaments sanctioned by the Badminton World Federation (BWF) and played between 2007 and 2017.

Women's singles

Mixed doubles

  BWF Grand Prix Gold tournament
  BWF Grand Prix tournament

BWF International Challenge/Series 
Women's singles

Women's doubles

Mixed doubles

  BWF International Challenge tournament
  BWF International Series tournament
  BWF Future Series tournament

References

External links 
 
 

1988 births
Living people
People from Raphoe
Sportspeople from County Donegal
Irish female badminton players
Badminton players at the 2008 Summer Olympics
Badminton players at the 2012 Summer Olympics
Badminton players at the 2016 Summer Olympics
Olympic badminton players of Ireland
Badminton players at the 2015 European Games
Badminton players at the 2019 European Games
European Games bronze medalists for Ireland
European Games medalists in badminton